The Supreme Court of Azad Jammu & Kashmir is the highest court of appeal in Azad Jammu and Kashmir. It consists of a Chief Justice and two other Judges.

The number of judges in the ‘‘AJK’’ Supreme Court has been fixed at three by the ‘‘AJK’’ Interim Constitution Act, 1974. Per this constitution, the judges are appointed by the President of Azad Jammu and Kashmir on the advice of the prime minister of Pakistan.

In April 2020, Raja Saeed Akram Khan was the acting Chief Justice of Azad Jammu and Kashmir Supreme Court who took oath from the president of Azad Jammu and Kashmir Masood Khan.

Court composition 
The justices and jurists of the supreme court are set to retire at the age of 65, unless the jurists sooner resign or are removed from office, or records written reasons for deviating from this rule in accordance with the Interim Constitution of Azad Jammu and Kashmir (1974). By the amendment of AJK Constitution in 1993, there is a fixed number of justices at 3 and, as of current, there are currently 2 judges and one Chief Justice in Supreme Court of AJK. There are one ad hoc appointment of the jurists i the court.

Chief Justice of AJK and justices 
Having been appointed on May 18, 2021, Raja Saeed Akram Khan is currently serving as Chief Justice of AJK. According to seniority, the Supreme Court currently consists of the two regular judges listed below, along with the Chief Justice, and one ad hoc judge.

Jurisdiction 
A challenge from any judgement, decree, final decision, or sentence of the High Court of Azad Jammu and Kashmir may be made to the Supreme Court of Azad Jammu and Kashmir under subsection (11) of section 42 of the AJ&K Interim Constitution Act, 1974. Similar to the Supreme Court, an appeal is also available from the ruling issued by the Azad Jammu and Kashmir Shariat Court pursuant to the Islamic Penal Laws Act, Shariat Court Act, and other Islamic Penal Laws.

If the Supreme Court grants leave to appeal, any judgment, decree, order, or sentence of the High Court may be appealed to the Supreme Court in situations where sub-section (11) of section 42 is not applicable. In a similar manner, under subsection (3) of section 47 of the Interim Constitution Act, an appeal may be made to the Supreme Court from a decision made by an administrative court or tribunal if it involves a material issue of law that is of public importance and the Supreme Court grants leave to appeal.

The AJ&K Interim Constitution Act, 1974 does not contain a clause similar to article 184(3) of the Islamic Republic of Pakistan, 1973 Constitution that grants the Supreme Court of Pakistan original jurisdiction. As the board of judicial advisors and judicial board formerly were, the Supreme Court of Azad Jammu and Kashmir now simply serves as the appellate court. Except in an appeal, it cannot consider any direct petitions or issue any orders. Its advisory authority under section 46-A of the Interim Constitution Act is the only original jurisdiction it has. The Supreme Court of Azad Jammu and Kashmir has equal and identical appellate authority to the Supreme Court of Pakistan.

See also
High Court of Azad Jammu & Kashmir

References

External links
Official website

Judiciary of Azad Kashmir